Reisseronia flavociliella is a moth of the Psychidae family. It is found in Turkey.

References

Moths described in 1864
Psychidae
Endemic fauna of Turkey
Insects of Turkey